"Everyone Deserves Music" is a single by Michael Franti & Spearhead from their album Everyone Deserves Music.

The song was ranked #34 on Triple J's Hottest 100 for 2003.

Track listings
Australian CD Single
 "Everyone Deserves Music" (edit) – 3:43
 "Feelin' Free" (clothing optional mix) – 4:26
 Taxi Radio – 3:46
 Enhanced Computer Section (CD-ROM)

UK CD Single
 "Everyone Deserves Music" (Original)
 "Everyone Deserves Music" (Frequency 3 Remix by J Bowman)
 "Feelin' Free" (Clothing Optional Mix) - 4:26
 "What I Be" (Jonah Sharp Remix)

Official versions
 "Everyone Deserves Music" (Album Version) - 4:36
 "Everyone Deserves Music" (Edit) - 3:43
 "Everyone Deserves Music" (Frequency 3 Remix by J Bowman)

2003 singles
2003 songs